The 2022 WNBA Draft, the WNBA's draft for the 2022 WNBA season, was held on April 11, 2022 in New York City and aired live on ESPN in the United States and on TSN1/4 in Canada at 7:00 p.m. EDT.  The draft was the 27th in WNBA history.

Draft lottery
The lottery selection to determine the order of the top four picks in the 2022 draft took place on December 19, 2021 and was televised on ESPN in the United States and on TSN2 in Canada. The four non-playoff teams in 2021 qualified for the lottery drawing: Atlanta Dream, Indiana Fever, Washington Mystics, and the Los Angeles Sparks. With the Sparks having previously traded their 2022 first-round pick, their lottery pick belonged to the Dallas Wings at the time of the lottery. The Mystics won the lottery and had the first pick in the draft. This was the first time that the Mystics won the lottery in franchise history. The next three picks initially belonged to the Fever, Dream, and Wings. However, by the time of the draft, the only one of the top four picks that still belonged to the same team was that of the Fever. In March 2022, the Wings included their lottery pick in a larger trade with the Fever. Less than a week before the draft, the Mystics and Dream would swap their top-three picks, with the Mystics also sending the Dream a 2022 second-round pick and the rights to swap picks with the Sparks in 2023.

Lottery chances

The lottery odds were based on combined records from the 2020 and 2021 WNBA seasons. In the drawing, 14 balls numbered 1–14 are placed in a lottery machine and mixed. Four balls are drawn to determine a four-digit combination (only 11–12–13–14 is ignored and redrawn). The team to which that four-ball combination is assigned receives the No. 1 pick. The four balls are then placed back into the machine and the process is repeated to determine the second pick. The two teams whose numerical combinations do not come up in the lottery will select in the inverse order of their two-year cumulative record. Ernst & Young knows the discreet results before they are announced. 

The order of selection for the remainder of the first round as well as the second and third rounds was determined by inverse order of the teams' respective regular-season records solely from 2021.

Eligibility
Under the current collective bargaining agreement (CBA) between the WNBA and its players' union, draft eligibility for players not defined as "international" requires the following to be true:
 The player's 22nd birthday falls during the calendar year of the draft. For this draft, the cutoff birth date is December 31, 2000.
 She has either:
 completed her college eligibility;
 received a bachelor's degree, or is scheduled to receive such in the 3 months following the draft; or
 is at least 4 years removed from high school graduation.

A player who is scheduled to receive her bachelor's degree within 3 months of the draft date, and is younger than the cutoff age, is only eligible if the calendar year of the draft is no earlier than the fourth after her high school graduation.

Players with remaining college eligibility who meet the cutoff age must notify the WNBA headquarters of their intent to enter the draft no later than 10 days before the draft date, and must renounce any remaining college eligibility to do so. A separate notification timetable is provided for players involved in postseason tournaments (most notably the NCAA Division I tournament); those players (normally) must declare for the draft within 24 hours of their final game.

"International players" are defined as those for whom all of the following is true:
 Born and currently residing outside the U.S.
 Never "exercised intercollegiate basketball eligibility" in the U.S.

For "international players", the eligibility age is 20, also measured on December 31 of the year of the draft.

Key

Draft

First round

Second round

Third round

Footnotes

References

Women's National Basketball Association Draft
WNBA draft